Cocculina is a genus of sea snails, deep-sea limpets, marine gastropod mollusks in the family Cocculinidae.

Species
Species within the genus Cocculina include:
 Cocculina alveolata Schepman, 1908
 Cocculina angulata R. B. Watson, 1883
 Cocculina baxteri McLean, 1987
 Cocculina cervae Fleming, 1948
 Cocculina cowani McLean, 1987
 Cocculina craigsmithi McLean, 1992
 Cocculina dalli A. E. Verrill, 1884
 Cocculina diomedae Dall, 1908
 Cocculina emsoni McLean & Harasewych, 1995
 Cocculina fenestrata Ardila & Harasewych, 2005
 Cocculina japonica Dall, 1907
 Cocculina leptalea A. E. Verrill, 1884
 Cocculina leptoglypta Dautzenberg & Fischer H., 1897
 Cocculina mamilla Di Geronimo, 1974
 Cocculina messingi McLean & Harasewych, 1995
 Cocculina nassa Dall, 1908
 Cocculina pacifica Kuroda & Habe, 1949
 Cocculina rathbuni Dall, 1882
 Cocculina superba Clarke, 1960
 Cocculina surugaensis Hasegawa, 1997 
 Cocculina tenuitesta Hasegawa, 1997
Species brought into synonymy
 Cocculina agassizii Dall, 1908 : synonym of Coccocrater agassizii (Dall, 1908) (original combination)
 Cocculina casanica Dall, 1919: synonym of Lepeta caeca (O. F. Müller, 1776)
 Cocculina coercita Hedley, 1907: synonym of Cocculinella coercita (Hedley, 1907)
 Cocculina corrugata Jeffreys, 1883: synonym of Copulabyssia corrugata (Jeffreys, 1883)
 Cocculina craticulata Suter, 1908: synonym of Notocrater craticulata (Suter, 1908)
 Cocculina maxima Dautzenberg, 1925 : synonym of  Pectinodonta maxima (Dautzenberg, 1925)
 Cocculina meridionalis Hedley, 1903: synonym of Propilidium tasmanicum (Pilsbry, 1895)
 Cocculina punctoradiata Kuroda & Habe, 1949: synonym of Coccopigya punctoradiata (Kuroda & Habe, 1949)
 Cocculina pustulosa Thiele, 1929: synonym of Notocrater minuta (Habe, 1958)
 Cocculina rhyssa Dall, 1925: synonym of Pectinodonta rhyssa (Dall, 1925)
 Cocculina spinigera Jeffreys, 1883: synonym of Coccopigya spinigera (Jeffreys, 1883)
Nomen dubium
 Cocculina ionica (Nordsieck F., 1973) (nomen dubium)

References

 Gofas, S.; Le Renard, J.; Bouchet, P. (2001). Mollusca, in: Costello, M.J. et al. (Ed.) (2001). European register of marine species: a check-list of the marine species in Europe and a bibliography of guides to their identification. Collection Patrimoines Naturels, 50: pp. 180–213

External links

Cocculinidae
Gastropod genera